Christine Eleonore of Stolberg-Gedern (12 September 1692, 3 August 1745). was a German noblewoman of The House of Stolberg and by marriage Countess of Isenburg-Büdingen.

Early life and marriage 
Christine Eleonore was born on 12 September 1692, the eleventh child of Christine of Mecklenburg-Güstrow and Louis Christian, Count of Stolberg-Gedern.

Chrsitine married Ernst Casimir of on 8 August 1708, in Büdingen. Together the couple had five children.

Christine was fifty when she died on 3 August 1745, in Büdingen, where she was buried at the Familienfriedhof Ysenburg-Büdingen.

References 

1692 births
1745 deaths
House of Stolberg